Something Got Lost Between Here and the Orbit is an album by Royal Canoe, released in 2016.

Critical reception
Exclaim! wrote that "there's a complete unpredictability to the movement and execution of their songs here, which often seem temporarily settled, only to then veer off and head for entirely uncharted territory." The Rutland Herald wrote that the album "serves up a winsome sound that’s as sultry, soul-stirring and beautiful as it is funky and dance-inducing."

Track listing
"Somersault" – 4:07
"Walk out on the Water" – 3:40
"Living a Lie" – 4:20
"Checkmate" – 3:32
"Love You Like That" – 3:57
"I am Collapsing so Slowly" – 5:13
"Holidays" – 5:26
"Out of the Beehive" – 3:36
"New Recording 270" – 0:48
"Bicycle" – 3:28
"How Long Is Your Life" – 5:28
"BB Gun" – 4:16

Personnel
Matt Peters – vocals, keyboard, acoustic guitar
Bucky Driedger – vocals, electric guitar
Matt Schellenberg – vocals, keyboard
Brendan Berg – vocals, bass guitar, keyboard
Derek Allard – drums
Michael Jordan – electronic drums

References

2016 albums
Royal Canoe albums
Albums produced by Ben H. Allen